Dürrnbachhorn is a mountain of Bavaria, Germany.
   
It is located on the Austrian border beside the town of Reit im Winkl in the district of Traunstein, in the federal-state of Bavaria. On the Austrian side lies the town of Unken in the district of Zell am See, Salzburg.

There is a chairlift from Winklmoos-Alm at a height of 1 190 m to Dürrnbacheck at a height of 1 610 m above sea level.

References 

Mountains of Bavaria
Chiemgau Alps
One-thousanders of Germany
Mountains of the Alps